Holistophallidae is a family of millipedes belonging to the order Polydesmida.

Genera:
 Duoporus Cook, 1901
 Elcarmenia Kraus, 1954
 Holistophallus Silvestri, 1909
 Pammicrophallus Pocock, 1909
 Synthodesmus Chamberlin, 1922
 Tunodesmus Chamberlin, 1922
 Zeuctodesmus Pocock, 1909

References

Polydesmida